A Kani shawl is a type of Kashmir shawl originating from the Kanihama area of the Kashmir valley. It is one of the oldest handicraft of Kashmir. This craft has been a part of the valley since the time of Mughals. The shawls are woven from pashmina yarn. The government of Jammu and Kashmir has granted a geographical indication to the Kani shawl, making it illegal to sell shawls made outside of the Kanihama area as Kani shawls.

History 
Kani weaving is believed to be an art indigenous to Kanihama and traced back to 3000 BC. This exquisite shawl was once coveted by Mughal Kings, Sikh Maharajas and British Aristocrats. The Ain-i-Akbari records that Emperor Akbar was an avid collector of Kani shawls.

While the name 'Kani' comes from the area where this particular artisans come from, Kanihama, the word 'Kani' - in Kashmiri - also means a small wooden oblong spool.

Preparation 
Kani shawl is made from pashmina on a handloom. But instead of a shuttle used in regular pashmina shawls, Kani shawls use needles made from cane or wood. The   distinguishable, Mughal patterns, usually of flowers and leaves, are woven into the fabric like a carpet, thread by thread, based on the coded pattern called 'Talim'. The talim guides the weaver in number of warp threads to be covered in a particular colored-weft.

Families who are in weaving Kani Shawls usually work patiently, working between 5 and 7 hours a day, in between attending to their household chores. Depending on the intricacy and complexity of the design being woven, an artisan can weave a maximum of few centimetres per day.  Depending on the design, size and detailing, a Kani Shawl may take anything between 6 and 18 months to be completed.

Only the trained craftsmen are knowledgeable enough to weave Kani Shawls the right way. The techniques and knowledge have been transferring from forefathers to next generations. It is estimated that from the 10,000-odd kani weavers, only 2,000 are left today.

See also 
Kashmiri handicrafts

References

Kashmir
Textiles
Geographical indications in Jammu and Kashmir
Indian shawls and wraps